Logisticus is a genus of beetles in the family Cerambycidae, containing the following species:

 Logisticus angustatus Waterhouse, 1880
 Logisticus bicolor Vives, 2004
 Logisticus fuscopunctatus Fairmaire, 1903
 Logisticus iners Fairmaire, 1903
 Logisticus modestus Waterhouse, 1882
 Logisticus obscurus Waterhouse, 1880
 Logisticus obtusipennis Fairmaire, 1901
 Logisticus pachydermus Fairmaire, 1893
 Logisticus plicicollis Fairmaire, 1901
 Logisticus proboscideus Fairmaire, 1902
 Logisticus quentini Vives, 2004
 Logisticus rostratus Waterhouse, 1878
 Logisticus sesquivittatus Fairmaire, 1888
 Logisticus simplex Waterhouse, 1880
 Logisticus spinipennis Fairmaire, 1893
 Logisticus suturalis Waterhouse, 1880
 Logisticus villiersi Vives, 2004

References

Dorcasominae